During the 1880s and 1890s, William Dean constructed a series of experimental locomotives to test various new ideas in locomotive construction for the Great Western Railway.

Locomotives

No. 1
This locomotive appeared in 1880 as a 4-4-0T, but was rebuilt in 1882 as a 2-4-0T. It was withdrawn in 1924.

No. 7
Number 7 was built in 1886 at Swindon as a tandem compound 2-4-0 with  coupled wheels and outside frames. The  diameter low pressure cylinders were in front of the high pressure cylinders, the pistons being carried on the same piston rod. Valves for the low pressure cylinders were below, and those for the high pressure cylinders above the cylinders. One set of valve gear drove each pair of valve spindles. This setup proved difficult to access for maintenance, and the locomotive was relegated to minor routes. It was broken up in 1890. The wheel centres were used in building No. 7 of the Armstrong class.

No. 8
Number 8 was built in 1886 as a  broad gauge convertible 2-4-0 tandem compound, the low- and high-pressure piston rods sharing a common crosshead. The frames consisted of a double frame supporting the driving axleboxes, and an external frame from which the hornblocks for the leading wheels projected. In 1894 the wheel centres were used in a conventional standard gauge 4-4-0, No. 8 of the Armstrong class.

No. 9
This number started out in 1881 on a 4-2-4T, the only tank locomotive built by the Great Western Railway with single driving wheels (though not the only such tank locomotive operated by the Great Western, which inherited some from the Bristol and Exeter Railway), these being  in diameter and had unusually large  cylinders. It did little work as it was prone to derailing, indeed it did this in front of William Dean on its first trial move out of the shed.

In 1884, it was rebuilt as a strange-looking 2-2-2 tender locomotive with outside Stephenson's valve gear. In 1890, it was rebuilt with more conventional double frames and inside valve gear similar in style to the Queen Class. In this guise it was named Victoria in honour of Queen Victoria.

No. 10
A 2-2-2 locomotive that, as with number 9, was eventually rebuilt to be similar to the Queen class. In this latter guise it was named Royal Albert in honour of Prince Albert, husband of Queen Victoria.

No. 13
Tank locomotive number 13 first appeared in 1886 as a 2-4-2WT, or well tank. In this form it worked on the St Ives branch and also on the Watlington branch.

In 1897, it was rebuilt as a 4-4-0ST, or saddle tank. The large bunker and rear water tank were reduced in size. This allowed the rear carrying wheels to be removed, and a saddle tank fitted over the boiler. The frames were extended to allow the fitting of a bogie truck at the front. It continued to work on various branch lines, being loaned to the Liskeard and Looe Railway and later continuing to work on the Looe branch. It was also recorded on the Highworth and Brixham branches, and working in the Plymouth area, before finally moving to Swindon, from where it was withdrawn in 1926.

Nos. 14 and 16
Two rather more conventional 2-4-0 express locomotives were turned out in 1888 and ran on the broad gauge. They were similar to the standard gauge  3206 Class Barnum's turned out in 1889 but with large  in driving wheels.

Following the abolition of the broad gauge in 1892, they were renewed, reappearing as standard gauge 4-4-0 locomotives in 1894.

No. 1490
In 1898, after Churchward had become Dean's assistant, a solitary 4-4-0PT was built at Swindon (Lot no. 114, works no. 1702), and was the first GWR locomotive with pannier tanks. It had  driving wheels, and was intended as the prototype of a new class for working over the Metropolitan Railway, but was both unstable and too heavy. After a few years spent shunting, it was sold in 1907 by the GWR to the Ebbw Vale Steel, Iron & Coal Co. In 1908 it came into the possession of the Brecon and Merthyr Tydfil Junction Railway, which numbered it 35, but sold it again in 1916 to the Cramlington Colliery Co. It was eventually scrapped in 1929.

References

Sources
 
 
 
 
 
 

Dean
Broad gauge (7 feet) railway locomotives
2-4-0 locomotives
4-4-0 locomotives
4-2-4T locomotives
2-4-2T locomotives
Experimental locomotives
 Scrapped locomotives